Bazille's Studio (L'atelier de Bazille) is an oil-on-canvas painting created in 1870 by the French impressionist Frédéric Bazille in collaboration with Édouard Manet. It has been kept at the Musée d'Orsay in Paris since 1986. It shows the artist himself surrounded by his friends in his studio, including the painters Édouard Manet and Pierre-Auguste Renoir.

Bazille shared the studio on the rue de la Condamine with Renoir from January 1868 to May 1870. The tall Bazille is center stage, holding a palette, having in his own words been "painted in by Manet". On the right, Edmond Maître, a friend of Bazille, is seated at the piano under a Monet still life. Manet is talking to Bazille and Renoir is seated.

The pictures on the wall surrounding the artists are ones that had been rejected at some time by the Salon and for which Bazille is expressing his support. Some of the paintings depicted are La Toilette (Montpelier, Musée Favre) above the sofa, Fisherman with a Net (Zürich, Fondation Rau) on the high left, and a large landscape with two people (Paysage avec deux figures) by Renoir (to the top right of the window, framed) of which only the lower left half survives (Woman with Bird).

See also
 Lise Tréhot

References

1870 paintings
Paintings by Frédéric Bazille
Paintings in the collection of the Musée d'Orsay
Paintings about painting
Musical instruments in art
Cultural depictions of Pierre-Auguste Renoir
Cultural depictions of Édouard Manet